Pathiyanadu Sree Bhadrakali Temple is one of Hindu goddess Bhadrakali temple in Kerala. The shrine is in Mullassery. It is 1.5 kilometres (0.93 miles) from Karakulam under Nedumangad Thaluk. It is 12.5 kilometres (7.8 miles) from Thiruvananthapuram. The temple is managed by Pathiyanadu Sree Bhadrakali Kshetram Trust.

Priests 
Kshetra Thantri :- Brahma Sree Attukal Dhamodharan Namboothirippadu

Kshetra Melshanthi :- Vishnu Buddhan Potty

Deities 
The temple enshrines Goddess Bhadrakali as the presiding Deity. The idol stands for Goddess Bhadrakali, the daughter of Lord Shiva. Goddess Kali is situated toward the north (vadakke nada). The idol is known in the local Malayalam language as Thirumudi. 
Other deities worshipped at the Pathiyanadu Sree Bhadrakali Temple called Upadevatha's temples include Lord MahaGanapathy, Mantramoorthi, Navagraha and Nagaraja. The temple also has a small sub-temple where another deity Madan Thampuran is enshrined.

Kali - Darika Myth 

Darika was a demon who received a boon from Brahma which granted that he would never be defeated by any man living in any of the fourteen worlds of Hindu mythology. This made Darika immensely powerful and arrogant. Armed with this boon, Darika went on to conquer the world, defeating even Indra, the king of the gods. As his atrocities became intolerable, the sage Narada requested Shiva to contain Darika. Shiva agreed, circumventing Brahma's boon by declaring that Darika would be killed by the goddess Kali. Shiva opened his third eye and produced Kali, whose purpose was to destroy Darika. Goddess being a woman and one not born among the humans. Goddess did so by beheading him. Goddess didn't stop with Darika and, unable to control her rage, began destroying the landscape and the very humans for whose sake she had destroyed Darika. The Gods could not defeat her, and she was finally calmed when Shiva lay on the ground in front of her, submitting.

Festival 
Pathiyanadu Sree Bhadrakali Temple Festival held every year, usually between February and March. But the Dikkubali Mahotsavam held on every three years and Paranettu Mahotsavam held on every six years. These Festivals begins in Malayalam month of Kumbham and the nakshatra Bharani, So all these festivals called Kumbhabharani Mahotsavam.

Swayamvara Parvathy Pooja 
This pooja is held on the Festival time i.e. on the Third day of Festival, On that day girls above 18 came here and participate in this pooja to remove their Dhoshas on their marriage, and get married soon and also get good groom (only for girls above 18, who are not get married). On that day Trikalayanam( marriage of goddess Bhadrakali, based on Chilapathikaram )takesplaces. There are thousands and thousands of people came here to see this pooja and participate Trikalayanam and to get goddess blessings.

Grahalekshmi Pooja 
It is the pooja which is seen only in this temple in kerala. It is on the Festival days many people participate in this pooja to remove Durdevadas from their house and get Lekshmi Devi's blessings to their house.

Grahadhosha Nivarana Pooja 
It is the pooja which is seen only in this temple in kerala. It is on the Festival days many people participate in this pooja to remove Dhosham like (black magic etc.) from their house.

Balithooval 
It is the pooja held on the fifth day of festival, it is performed by priest of the temple 
performs some trance like dances until he is unconscious. It is done to remove Dhosham like Drishti dhosham, Vilidhosham, Black Magict etc. It believed that on this pooja the presiding deity's bhoothaganams remove these dhosham from the people who participated in this pooja and also to the people who watching this pooja.

Sarppabali 
It is performed by the Kshetra thantri, on Festival day. This pooja is conducted to remove Sarppadhoshas.

Kalamkaval 
Kalamkaval is a famous customs practiced at the temple premises and nearby places during festival. It is believed that the Goddess Bhadrakali searches her enemy demon, Daaruka in all directions before putting him to death. Devotees commemorate this legend by seeing this unique Kalamkaval. Kalamkaval is the ritual in which chief priest, carries the idol on his head and performs some trance like dances until he is unconscious. During kalamkaval, chief priest wears anklet and thiruvabharam (traditional gold ornaments of goddess that includes kappu, vanki, odyanam, paalakka mala, pichi mottu mala, muthu mala etc.). All people believe that the priest gets strength to carry on the trance with the idol on his head, due to the blessings of the Devi enshrined in the temple.

Dikkubali 
It is believed that Pathiyanadu Sree Bhadrakali searches her enemy demon, Daaruka in all four directions before putting him to death. The four directions are East, South, West, North and also in each of these direction Kalamkaval and Gurusi takesplace.

Paranettu 
It is believed that a fight erupted between Devi and the demon Darikan in sky. The fight is enacted on a specially erected stage made by coconut tree, about 100 feet high and is conducted at night known as Paranettu.

Nilathilporu 
Nilathilporu that marks the conclusion of the Kumbhabharani Paranettu festival at Pathiyanadu Sree Bhadrakali Temple. During the climactic moment of this ceremony, the demon Daarika (the man with the symbolic crown in the foreground) weeps and begs for mercy from the Goddess. Subsequently, the Goddess beheads the demon.

Aaraattu 
The festival, ended with a grand procession knows as Aaraattu. During Aaraattu the Idol is cleaned using water collected from 101 pots. Aaraattu is conducted at Pathiyanadu Ambalakkadavu. Girls below ten years of age, along with chief priest performs the function.

Pongala 
Pongala at Pathiyanadu Sree Bhadrakali Temple is celebrated during the Festival of Malayalam month of Kumbham on the Punartham Nakshatram (Punarvasu Nakshatra). Pongala is the rice cooked with jaggery, ghee, coconut as well as other ingredients in the pots by women to please the Goddess. In 
Pathiyanadu Sree Bhadrakali Temple Pongal Thousands and Thousands of Women from different places came and put pongala to makes their wishes true.

Nercha 
Akathu Nivedhyam, Kumkumaarchana, Ikyamathyarchana, Vidhyaasooktham, Rakthapushpaarchana, Bhaagyasooktharchana, Saraswathymantrarchana, Shatruthaasamhararchana, Swayamvaraarchana,  Muttirakku (only on Sundays), Kumkumabhishekam(only on Sundays), Manjalabhishekam(only on Sundays), ManjalPara(only on Sundays), Swayamavara homam (specific months), Ganapathy homam, Mahaganapathy homam (on swayamvarahomam days and on vinayaka chathurthi),Chandika Homam (once in a year),Guruthi Pushpanjali (only on Sundays), Thattam pooja(with all fruits), Nagarchana, Ayilya Pooja, Thulaabhaaram, Kunjoonu, Aazhcha Pooja, Visheshal Pooja etc.

Swayamavara Homam

Swayamvara Homam is held once in three months, for the people who are not get married and having dhoshams in horoscope . In this Pooja both men and women can attend.

Navagraha Archana, Navagraha Homam, Navagraha Charth

Pooja Timings 
The Temple opens on every Tuesday (03:30pm –07:30pm), 
Friday (04:00pm–07:30pm), Sunday (07:30am–01:00pm). 
First day of all Malayalam months, temple will open at morning 5.30am and close at 12.00pm and open at evening 04:00pm and close at 07:00pm(On all first day of Malayalam Month, Annadhanam is there). And also Temple opens on all Hindu Festivals.

Cultural Programmes 
There are many cultural programmes held on Festival days, Karkkidakavavu bali, etc. On the Festival days Samskaarika Sammelanam takes place. On that occasion several awards are given to the talented people. Awards like the sadhchitra award, Kalamadhyamasreshtta Puraskaaram, and also awards for the students who are talented in several arts and also in studies. The Kalamadhyamasreshtta Puraskaaram is given to the people who show talent in the fields of Films, Media, etc. In 2011, the Kalamadhyamasreshtta Puraskaaram was given to the actress Chippi; in 2012 it was given to cinema serial actress Indhulekha; In 2013 to Actor Madhu, in 2014 to Sugathakumari teacher, and in 2015 to Kavaalam Narayana Panicker.

Contact Details 
Pathiyanadu Sree Bhadrakali Temple Trust

Mullassery, Karakulam. P.O

Thiruvananthapuram, Kerala -695564

Phone No :- 9778025098

References 

Hindu temples in Thiruvananthapuram district
Devi temples in Kerala